Shayon Adam Harrison (born 13 July 1997) is an English professional footballer who plays as a forward for Politehnica Iași.

Club career

Tottenham Hotspur
Harrison made his professional debut for Tottenham on 25 October 2016, coming on in the 83rd minute for Georges-Kévin Nkoudou in a 2–1 defeat to Liverpool in the EFL Cup.

On 20 January 2017, Harrison joined League Two side Yeovil Town on loan until the end of the season. He made his debut for Yeovil in a 2–2 draw against Blackpool, on 21 January 2017. For the second half of the 2017–18 season Harrison went on loan to Southend United.

In the January 2019 transfer window, Harrison went out on loan to Australian club Melbourne City of the A-League.

Almere City
In the summer 2019 transfer window, Harrison signed for Almere City in Holland. On 1 February 2021, he was released by Almere.

AFC Wimbledon
On 8 February 2021, Harrison joined League One side AFC Wimbledon on a free transfer.

Morecambe
On 11 August 2021, Harrison joined League One side Morecambe. On 11 January 2022, Harrison left the club following the expiration of his short-term contract.

On 1 March 2022, Harrison joined Southern League Premier Division South leaders Hayes & Yeading United.

On 25 August 2022, Harrison was officially announced as joining Romanian Liga II side Politehnica Iași.

Career statistics

References

External links
 

1997 births
Living people
English footballers
Footballers from Hornsey
Black British sportspeople
English people of Jamaican descent
Association football forwards
Tottenham Hotspur F.C. players
Yeovil Town F.C. players
Southend United F.C. players
Melbourne City FC players
Almere City FC players
AFC Wimbledon players
Morecambe F.C. players
Hayes & Yeading United F.C. players
FC Politehnica Iași (2010) players
English Football League players
A-League Men players
Eerste Divisie players
Liga II players
English expatriate footballers
English expatriate sportspeople in Australia
English expatriate sportspeople in the Netherlands
English expatriate sportspeople in Romania
Expatriate soccer players in Australia
Expatriate footballers in the Netherlands
Expatriate footballers in Romania